Isaac Kwame Asiamah (born 24 December 1975) is a Ghanaian politician of the Republic of Ghana. He is the Member of Parliament of Atwima Mponua constituency. He has been the member of parliament for the constituency  in the 4th, 5th, 6th, 7th and the 8th Parliament of the 4th Republic of Ghana.  He is a member of the New Patriotic Party of Ghana. From  February 2017 to January 2021, he served as the Minister of Youth and Sports.

Early life and education 
Isaac Asiamah was born in Mampong, Ghana on December 24, 1975. He attended the University of Ghana, Legon where he graduated with a Bachelor of Arts degree in Geography and Political Science, in 2000. He proceeded to the Ghana Institute of Management and Public Administration for his master's degree in Governance and Leadership, graduating in 2008.

Career 
Asiamah has had a varied professional background, including being employed as a Policy Analyst at the New Patriotic Party Headquarters in Accra. He was also the National Youth Secretary of the New Patriotic Party.

Political career 
Asiamah entered Ghanaian politics at an early age when he contested and won the Atwima Mponua constituency elections on the ticket of the NPP in 2005. When he won the seat, he was 29 years old, the youngest parliamentarian ever in Ghanaian political history. The current holder of the title of the youngest parliamentarian is Francisca Oteng-Mensah, who, in 2016, was elected at age 23.

Minister of Youth and Sports 
In January 2017, President Nana Akuffo-Addo nominated him for the position of Minister of Youth and Sports in Ghana. He was tasked with improving sporting disciplines and activities in the county by developing young athletes. The president encouraged him to put in place structures to streamline Ghanaian sports and use it as a platform to project Ghanaian athletes on the world stage.

Parliamentary vetting 
The Appointments Committee of Parliament vetted Asiamah on 7 February 2017. During the vetting, he articulated his views on how to improve sports in Ghana. One major change he intended to bring was to transparency in the dealing of the various national teams and government especially on the issue of allowances and bonuses allocated to players.

Swearing in 
President Akuffo-Addo swore in all the ministers who had been approved by Parliament on 10 February 2017. Asiamah was among ten other ministers who received their ministerial charters to begin work in their various ministries.

Elections 
Asiamah was elected as the member of parliament for the Atwima Mponua constituency of the Ashanti Region of Ghana for the first time in the 2004 Ghanaian general elections. He won on the ticket of the New Patriotic Party. His constituency was a part of the 36 parliamentary seats out of 39 seats won by the New Patriotic Party in that election for the Ashanti Region. The New Patriotic Party won a majority total of 128 parliamentary seats out of 230 seats.  He was elected with 30,012 votes out of 44,217 total valid votes cast equivalent to 67.9% of total valid votes cast. He was elected over John Macitse Oduro H. of the National Democratic Congress and Stephen Osei Bossman of the Convention People's Party. These obtained 30.5% and 1.7% respectively of total valid votes cast.

In 2008, he won the general elections on the ticket of the New Patriotic Party for the same constituency. His constituency was part of the 34 parliamentary seats out of 39 seats won by the New Patriotic Party in that election for the Ashanti Region. The New Patriotic Party won a minority total of 109 parliamentary seats out of 230 seats. He was elected with 25,350 votes out of 44,948 total valid votes cast equivalent to 56.4% of total valid votes cast. He was elected over Amoah Sarpong of the People's National Convention, Ali Yeboah of the National Democratic Congress, Kofi Takyi of the Democratic People's Party, Appiahhene Peter of the Convention People's Party and Raphael Baffour Awuah an independent candidate. These obtained 0.68%, 32.01%, 0.42%, 1.12% and 9.37% respectively of the total votes cast.

In 2012, he won the general elections on the ticket of the New Patriotic Party for the same constituency. He was elected with 33,961 votes out of 59,300 total valid votes cast equivalent to 57.27% of total valid votes cast. He was elected over Kwaku Agyemang-Mensah of the National Democratic Congress and Frank Tachie Mensah of the Convention People's Party. These obtained 41.94% and 0.79% respectively of the total votes cast. He was re-elected in the 2016 and 2020 general election to represent in both the 7th and 8th Parliament of the Fourth Republic of Ghana.

Personal life 
Asiamah is married with three children. He identifies as a Christian and is a member of the Anglican Church of Ghana.

See also 
 Minister of Youth and Sports
 Atwima Mponua constituency
 List of MPs elected in the 2016 Ghanaian parliamentary election

References 

1975 births
Living people
Ghanaian MPs 2005–2009
Ghanaian MPs 2009–2013
Ghanaian MPs 2013–2017
Ghanaian MPs 2017–2021
New Patriotic Party politicians
Ghanaian Anglicans
Government ministers of Ghana
University of Ghana alumni
Ghanaian MPs 2021–2025